George Elmore Danielson (February 20, 1915 – September 12, 1998) was an American Democratic politician and judge from California. He served in the United States House of Representatives from 1971 to 1982.

Biography
Born in Wausa, Nebraska, Danielson attended Wayne State Teachers College before earning his B.A. and J.D. from the University of Nebraska–Lincoln in 1937 and 1939, respectively. He was a special agent with the Federal Bureau of Investigation from 1939 to 1944 and served in the United States Navy Reserve from 1944 to 1946. He was an Assistant United States Attorney from 1949 to 1951 and thereafter entered private practice.

Danielson was twice elected to the California State Assembly, serving from 1963 to 1967, and to the California State Senate, serving from 1967 to 1971. In 1970, he was elected to his first of six terms to the U.S. House of Representatives. He served on the House Judiciary Committee during the impeachment proceedings against President Richard Nixon and voted in favor of three of the articles. Danielson resigned from Congress on March 9, 1982, after being appointed an associate justice on the California Court of Appeal in the Second District, Division Three by Governor Jerry Brown.

Danielson retired from the bench in April 1992. He died on September 12, 1998, of heart failure in Monterey Park, California.

See also

References

External links

Join California George E. Danielson

1915 births
1998 deaths
People from Knox County, Nebraska
People from Monterey Park, California
Judges of the California Courts of Appeal
Democratic Party members of the United States House of Representatives from California
Democratic Party California state senators
Democratic Party members of the California State Assembly
United States Navy reservists
United States Navy personnel of World War II
Assistant United States Attorneys
Federal Bureau of Investigation agents
University of Nebraska–Lincoln alumni
Wayne State College alumni
20th-century American judges
20th-century American politicians
Burials at Forest Lawn Memorial Park (Hollywood Hills)